Sofia Linette García Peralta (born 22 June 1998) is a Paraguayan professional golfer on the LPGA Tour.

Early life and amateur career
García was born in Asunción and enjoyed a successful amateur career. In 2013, she won the South American Junior Championship by ten strokes. She won the South American Amateur Golf Championship back to back in 2015 and 2016, the first winner from her country in this championship. In 2019, she won the Dutch International Junior Open.

She represented Paraguay at the Campeonato Sudamericano Copa Los Andes seven times between 2012 and 2019, and at the Espirito Santo Trophy in 2016 and 2018.

García attended Texas Tech University between 2016 and 2021, playing with the Texas Tech Red Raiders women's golf team. She posted a career stroke average of 72.2, a school record, and won four tournaments. She played on the winning Arnold Palmer Cup teams in 2019 and 2020, and was invited to play in the Augusta National Women's Amateur in 2020 and 2021.

At the 2019 Pan American Games, García teamed with Fabrizio Zanotti, Julieta Granada, and Carlos Franco, to win the silver medal in the mixed team event.

Professional career
García turned professional after graduating in 2021. Getting ready for Q-School, she played on the Women's All-Pro Tour (WAPT) where she was runner-up twice and finished fifth on the Order of Merit.

In 2022, she joined the Epson Tour, where she recorded five top-10 finishes including a season-best runner-up at the Carlisle Arizona Women's Golf Classic, three strokes behind Fátima Fernández Cano.

She qualified for the 2022 U.S. Women's Open after shooting 2-under-par 142 (70-72) in qualifying at Fox Run Golf Club. At Pine Needles Lodge & Golf Club, she shot 72-73-77-74 to finish T-60.

García earned her LPGA Tour card for 2023 via Q-School

Amateur wins
2013 South American Junior Championship
2014 Abierto Club de Golf del Uruguay, Abierto Sport Frances
2015 South American Amateur Golf Championship, Campeonato Sudamericano Juvenil, Abierto Sport Francés
2016 South American Amateur Golf Championship
2018 Illini Invitational at Medinah
2019 Reynolds Lake Oconee Invite, Valspar Augusta Invitational, Dutch International Junior Open, SMU Trinity Forest Invitation 
2021 Maryb S Kauth Invitational

Source:

Results in LPGA majors

"T" = tied

Team appearances
Amateur
Campeonato Sudamericano Copa Los Andes (representing Paraguay): 2012, 2013, 2014, 2015, 2016, 2018, 2019
Espirito Santo Trophy (representing Paraguay): 2016, 2018
Arnold Palmer Cup (representing the International team): 2019 (winners), 2020 (winners)

References

External links

Paraguayan female golfers
LPGA Tour golfers
Texas Tech Red Raiders women's golfers
Pan American Games silver medalists for Paraguay
Pan American Games medalists in golf
Golfers at the 2019 Pan American Games
Medalists at the 2019 Pan American Games
Sportspeople from Asunción
1998 births
Living people